Leobardo Ezequiel Siqueiros Osorio (born 3 February 1994 in Los Mochis, Sinaloa) is a Mexican professional footballer who his career started at the young age of 14 years old. Siqueiros plays for Juárez of Ascenso MX on loan from Monterrey.

External links

Living people
1994 births
Mexican footballers
C.F. Monterrey players
Ocelotes UNACH footballers
FC Juárez footballers
Ascenso MX players
Liga Premier de México players
Tercera División de México players
Footballers from Sinaloa
People from Ahome Municipality

Association footballers not categorized by position